Christopher G. Fallon (born June 7, 1952, in Malden, Massachusetts) is an American politician who represented the 33rd Middlesex District in the Massachusetts House of Representatives from 2003 to 2015 and was a member of the Malden School Committee from 1989 to 1997. He declined to seek re-election in 2014 and was succeeded by Steven Ultrino.

Early life and education 
Fallon was born in Malden, Massachusetts on June 7, 1953. He graduated with a B.S. from Merrimack College, an M.S. from the University of Lowell and subsequently obtained a J.D. from Suffolk University Law School.

References

1952 births
Politicians from Malden, Massachusetts
Merrimack College alumni
University of Massachusetts Lowell alumni
Suffolk University Law School alumni
Living people
Democratic Party members of the Massachusetts House of Representatives